

The Kuiu Wilderness and Tebenkof Bay Wilderness are federally designated wilderness areas within the Tongass National Forest, located on Kuiu Island, Petersburg Census Area, Alaska. The  Kuiu and  Tebenkof Bay wildernesses are managed by the United States Forest Service as a single area—creating a  wilderness preserve covering the heart of the island.

Tebenkof Bay Wilderness was created by Congress and signed into law on December 2, 1980, as a provision of the Alaska National Interest Lands Conservation Act. The Kuiu was created by Congress and signed into law on November 28, 1990, as part of the Tongass Timber Reform Act.

Ecology and history 
The landscape of Kuiu Island has much in common with other areas of the Alexander Archipelago — heavily glaciated mountains alternating with narrow, deep fjords. Within the wilderness areas can be found a variety of ecological communities, including muskeg, Pacific temperate rain forest dominated by Sitka spruce and western hemlock, and alpine tundra zones as low as 2,000 feet above sea level. Prior to European colonization, significant populations of Tlingit native people lived on the island, particularly in Tebenkof Bay.

Recreation 

Access to the wilderness is possible only by boat or floatplane, with the most convenient Alaska Marine Highway ferry terminal being in Kake. One rustic camping shelter is available on a first-come, first-served basis, located near the shoreline of the Bay of Pillars. The shelter was built in 1997, but was designed to be reminiscent of those constructed in the 1930s by Civilian Conservation Corps crews working in Southeast Alaska.

The two wilderness areas are a popular destination for kayaking and canoeing, offering experienced backcountry paddlers a mix of peaceful, sheltered waterways and difficult, open-ocean traverses. Several portages are available when seas are particularly treacherous.

See also

References

External links 
Wilderness Areas of the Petersburg Ranger District - Tongass National Forest official site
Kuiu Wilderness - Wilderness.net
Tebenkof Bay Wilderness - Wilderness.net

Wilderness areas of the Tongass National Forest
IUCN Category Ib
Alexander Archipelago
ANILCA establishments
Protected areas of Petersburg Borough, Alaska